The primary claimed benefit of the revolving cylinder, axial piston engine is that a four-cycle, reciprocating piston engine can be achieved without the need for a complex and expensive valve train.  The intake and exhaust flows are controlled by simple ports in the cylinder heads.  Costs are further reduced because all cylinders at each end of the engine share a common fuel injector and/or spark plug.  Additionally, the designs are typically compact and lightweight.

Description
Most revolving cylinder, axial piston engine designs utilize a fixed, multi-lobed barrel-type cam and rollers on the pistons to control the reciprocating movement of the pistons.  The benefit of this approach, versus a conventional crankshaft-and-connecting-rod mechanism, is that the kinematics of the piston motion can be optimized with regards to combustion cycle efficiency.

The primary drawback to the revolving cylinder, axial piston engine design is that rotating piston assemblies are subjected to centrifugal forces, which can result in significant friction losses.  These centrifugal forces increase at the square of the angular velocity.  So unless the engine is run at very low rotational speeds, the friction losses due to centrifugal forces acting on the piston assemblies can quickly become unacceptable.

Limited acceptance
To date, commercial or military acceptance of this design is limited to torpedo propulsion systems in current use (2009) by the United States Navy's mk 46 series and mk 48 series engines which use a derivative of the original Gould swashplate engine which was developed in the early 1960s for torpedo propulsion.

Problems associated with the design of the axial piston engine include high oil consumption, high fuel consumption, low rpm limit imposed by previously discussed frictional loads, low overall horsepower, mechanical complexity and complex machining methods needs to allow the engine to stand up to the loads imposed on the components. Additional problems are noted in that, the design does not have a long lifespan when compared to other engine designs due to large numbers of moving parts and relative high stresses. Wear and tear occurs at a faster rate because the engine makes more power pulses per turn of the cam than traditional engines. Lastly, due to very high initial torque and a need for large amounts of coolant, loss of oil or coolant to this design during running will almost certainly result in a catastrophic explosion of the engine because the engine generally has very light casings or shields located in the area around the cams and connecting rods.

The benefits of the design include relatively very high initial torque when compared to other engines, very compact design, able to be made to run on a variety of fuels from gasoline, diesel, kerosene, alcohol, to more exotic/energetic mixtures such as Otto Fuel, hydrogen peroxide/fuel mixes.

US patent classification 123/56.8 describes several examples.

See also
Cylindrical Energy Module

References

Piston engine configurations